Constantine Chrysomalus (or Constantine Chrysomallus) was a Byzantine monk who was posthumously condemned by a Synod of Constantinople as a teacher of heresies affiliated with Bogomilism and Messalianism. Although Chrysomalus and his writings, the Golden Sermons, had been accused of promoting Bogomil teachings, his association with Bogomilism has been contested by later scholars.

Condemnation
At the time of his condemnation, Chrysomalus' works had attained great popularity in the monastery of St. Nicholas in Hieron (likely a naval base on the Bosphoros), where he had only recently died. The posthumous trial was held at the church of St. Alexius in Constantinople in May 1140 under the authority of the patriarch Leo Styppeiotes, and the record of the trial still exists. Dimitri Obolensky lists the heretical doctrines that the Synod attributed to Chrysomalus:

The Synod claimed that Chrysomalus' replacement of the baptism with his own initiatory rite and the concept of two souls were signs of Bogomolism. This is disputed by Obolensky, who notes that the former was not exclusive to Bogomilism and that latter was generally associated elsewhere with Messalianism (a heresy also mentioned by the Synod).

Also attributed to Chrysomalus were teachings associated with civil disobedience: that the reverence of worldly rulers is akin to paying homage to Satan and that temporal authority should be denounced. Although this is similar to some practices attributed to the Bogomils by Cosmas the Priest, it is not possible to establish a definite connection.

References

12th-century Byzantine people
12th-century Byzantine writers
12th-century Eastern Orthodox theologians
12th-century Christian mystics
Byzantine clergy
Byzantine theologians
Eastern Orthodox mystics